Frank Blackhorse is one of several aliases used by a member of the American Indian Movement. He is perhaps best known for his participation in the Wounded Knee incident, particularly his role in the shootout that left two FBI and one American Indian dead and for becoming a fugitive on the run who fled to Canada shortly after.

Early life
Much of Blackhorse's early and personal life is shrouded in mystery. According to one source, Frank Blackhorse was born Frank Leonard Deluca. However, another source identifies Frank Blackhorse as being born Francis Deluca. Although Blackhorse self-identifies as a member of the Cherokee nation, some sources state that he is a non-Indian. Also supporting these claims is the FBI, who state that Blackhorse is of Italian ethnicity. Two sources posit that Blackhorse is of Jewish descent. Although Blackhorse claims to have been born in the town of Cherokee, North Carolina, the FBI claims that Blackhorse was born in the city of Cleveland, Ohio. In addition to the ambiguity surrounding Blackhorse's ethnicity, there is a relatively complex degree involved in ascertaining the exact nature of his identity. Blackhorse has an incredibly long list of aliases which he uses. The list of these aliases, include Francis Blackhorse, Frank DeLuca, Bruce Johnson, Richard Leon High Eagle, Richard Tall Bull, Mike Houston, Michael Houston, Teddy Louis and Teddy Lewis. A previous associate, Father Michael Campagna, affiliated with Campagna Academy (formerly Hoosier Boys' Town of Indiana) of Schererville, Indiana, came across the FBI Wanted Flyer #482, and identifies Blackhorse as Frank L. Deluca, whose original date of birth was 16 October 1954, whose place of birth was in the city of Chicago, Illinois to mother Kay Goldfein and Frank Deluca.

Wounded Knee
On 11 March 1973, FBI agent Curtis A. Fitzgerald took a bullet wound in the wrist. Although no conclusive evidence existed in regard to who fired the first shot that wounded Fitzgerald, Black Horse was arrested and charged with shooting Fitzgerald. Later that March, Black Horse was released on a $10,000.00 cash bond.

On 29 August 1974, a Federal Grand Jury in Sioux Falls, South Dakota indicted Frank Black Horse for allegedly shooting FBI Special Agent Curtis A. Fitzgerald at Wounded Knee, South Dakota. Blackhorse failed to make an appearance at the scheduled trial at Council Bluffs and United States District Court Judge Andrew W. Bogue subsequently issued a bench warrant for Black Horse.  His lawyer, Martha Copleman, was found in contempt of court regarding Blackhorse's no show for a trial.  Blackhorse's attorney fought to the Supreme Court for the right to "not" disclose why her client disappeared, a decision which was upheld by the Supreme Court.

Jumping Bull Compound shootout
Blackhorse was named a suspect in the RESMURS (a portmanteau of Reservation Murders), the name assigned to the investigation into an incident involving a shootout at Jumping Bull Compound that resulted in the murder of two FBI Special Agents, Jack Coler and Ronald Williams. Blackhorse made it on to the FBI's 10 Most Wanted List during the 1970s.

Aftermath
Leonard Peltier, along with Blackhorse, were arrested by the Royal Canadian Mounted Police in Hinton, Alberta, Canada at the Smallboy's Reserve/Smallboy Camp, transported to Calgary, Alberta and taken to the Oakalla Prison Farm in Vancouver, British Columbia on 6 February 1976. Both were extradited to the United States, but charges against Blackhorse related to the RESMURS were dropped. Several sources report that Blackhorse was never extradited. One source states that Frank Blackhorse was not extradited and allowed to roam free in Western Canada. The book Mi Taku'ye-Oyasin: The Native American Holocaust, Volume 2 indicated that Blackhorse fled the United States shortly after witnessing and/or participating in the murder of civil rights activist Ray Robinson and had remained in Canada "under various aliases."

Current whereabouts
Blackhorse's current whereabouts are unknown. According to the book When Will We Ever Learn, Blackhorse disappeared after not being charged in connection to RESMURS. One source indicates that Blackhorse was allowed to "disappear never to be heard from again." Author Antoinette Nora Claypoole, author of the Who Would Unbraid Her Hair: the Legend of Annie Mae, a book that explores the events leading up to the murder of Anna Mae Pictou-Aquash and attempts to pinpoint the identity of her murderer, indicated that Blackhorse had disappeared shortly after Peltier's arrest in Canada in 1976.

Legacy
There are many proponents of Leonard Peltier's innocence who believe Blackhorse is the key to securing Peltier's freedom. Blackhorse is believed to have information related to the murder of two FBI agents. Michael Kuzma, a defense attorney representing American Indian Movement activist Leonard Peltier, has appealed to the public in aiding the attorney in his mission to locate Blackhorse. Kuzma followed the plea up with a lawsuit filed in a federal court in the city of Buffalo, New York. On 13 May 2004, Kuzma filed an application with the U.S. Department of Justice to obtain the records in its possession pertaining to Blackhorse. On February 10, 2012, on Kuzma's behalf, attorneys Peter A. Reese, an attorney who provided assistance to Kuzma in the latter's unsuccessful attempt to secure the release documents via a Freedom of Information request, submitted on documents related to Blackhorse. and Daire Brian Irwin filed a suit in the US District Court in Buffalo, New York, seeking an order directing the Justice Department to release the requested records of Blackhorse. Kuzma has also claimed that Blackhorse was an FBI operative sent to infiltrate the ranks of AIM win the trust of its members. According to Kuzma, "The FBI set the wheels in motion that got its agents killed," which he believes happened when informants working on behalf of the agency infiltrated AIM (including Blackhorse), with Kuzma citing a previously obtained document, dated 15 January 1976, in which Deputy Director General (Ops) M. S. Sexsmith of the Royal Canadian Mounted Police wrote to a colleague about Blackhorse's surreptitious provision of information from within the American Indian Movement."

One source, the NPPA (No Parole Peltier Association (NPPA)), criticized Kuzma's efforts to get Peltier paroled by suggesting that Blackhorse was the reason Peltier was criticized. The NPPA points to several facts surrounding Leonard Peltier's case. They cite the fact that Peltier was aware of the individual who turned their group over to the Royal Canadian Mounted Police (old man Yellow bird, who was paid for his collaboration with the R.C.M.P.), "Peltier himself says that "the person who was responsible for our arrest was the old man Yellow bird who we learned later was paid for his work by the R.C.M.P," and the fact that Kuzma's discourse on Blackhorse in no way provides proof or connection to Peltier and the murder of Special Agents Coler and Williams.

See also
List of fugitives from justice who disappeared

References

20th century in South Dakota
1948 births
1973 in South Dakota
1973 murders in the United States
Activists from Ohio
American fraudsters
Members of the American Indian Movement
Crimes in South Dakota
Death in South Dakota
FBI Ten Most Wanted Fugitives
Native American history of South Dakota
Unidentified American criminals
Living people